The 1992 UK Championship was a professional ranking snooker tournament that took place at the Guild Hall in Preston, England. The event started on 13 November 1992 and the televised stages were shown on BBC between 21 and 29 November 1992.

It was the last UK Final to be staged over two days and to use the best of 31 frames format. The highest break of the televised stages was 136 made by James Wattana and the same of the non-televised stages was 147 made by Peter Ebdon.

In a repeat of the previous year's final  Jimmy White won his first and only UK Championship title by defeating defending champion John Parrott 16–9 in a reverse of the result in 1991, winning back-to-back ranking events after victory in the Grand Prix a month earlier.

Prize fund
The breakdown of prize money for this year is shown below:
Winner: £70,000
Runner-up: £35,000
High break: £5,000

Main draw

Final

Century breaks
All rounds

 147, 117  Peter Ebdon
 145, 123, 117, 115, 103, 102  Ronnie O'Sullivan
 140  Chris Scanlon
 140  Michael Valentine
 136, 110  James Wattana
 132, 109, 104  Steve James
 132  Paul Davies
 130  Darren Hackeson
 129, 109  Peter Francisco
 128  Dave Harold
 126, 103, 103  John Parrott
 122, 100  Darren Morgan
 120, 119, 104, 103  Alan McManus
 119, 109  Jimmy Michie
 118, 118, 116, 109, 101  Stephen Hendry
 118  Joe Canny
 116, 115, 106, 105, 102  Steve Davis
 114  Leigh Griffin
 111  John Giles
 111  Jimmy White
 109  Tony Drago
 107  Dominic Dale
 107  Noppadon Noppachorn
 107  Mark Williams
 105  Nick Dyson
 105  Will Jerram
 105  Wayne Jones
 105  Peter Lines
 105  Lee Richardson
 105  Gary Wilkinson
 104  Stephen Lee
 104  Alain Robidoux
 103  Garry Baldrey
 102  Phillip Seaton
 101  Dave Gilbert
 101  Dene O'Kane
 101  John Rees
 100  Mark Johnston-Allen
 100  Billy Snaddon
 100  Joe Swail

References

1992
UK Championship
UK Championship
UK Championship